The Prager–Lombard House is a house located in northwest Portland, Oregon, that is listed on the National Register of Historic Places.

See also
 National Register of Historic Places listings in Northwest Portland, Oregon

References

Houses on the National Register of Historic Places in Portland, Oregon
Houses completed in 1890
Queen Anne architecture in Oregon
1890 establishments in Oregon
Northwest Portland, Oregon
Historic district contributing properties in Oregon